The Greatest Thing I'll Never Learn is the debut mixtape by English musician, Dylan, released on 28 October 2022, peaking at number 19 on the British charts.

It was re-released on 24 February 2023 featuring a new track and 7 live recordings from her sold-out October 2022 headliner at London's KOKO theatre.

Reception

Michael Craig from The Guardian said "[Dylan] turns failed relationships into messy anthems, often dismissing no-mark exes, or clamouring for emotional parity, over stadium-sized, pop-punk tornados. She also explores that tricky grey area just as things start to fall apart, giving songs such as the thundering Lovestruck an extra dose of disillusionment."

Sophie Williams from NME said "[The EP] is a collection of neon-pink power pop that teases heavier influences, and maintains both tight riffs and a confident snarl. If this sounds like a lot to swallow, then you're absolutely right: it's a crowded but self-assured record – but Dylan has learned that by going for the big feelings, she inspires near-rapturous devotion."

Finlay Holden from Read Dork said "Self-aware, satirical and snappy tunes twist Dylan's trauma into catharsis as she successfully packs a punch into every track – whether it's the acceptance of 'Nothing Lasts Forever' or the striking loneliness of 'Home Is Where the Heart Is', it's hard to listen through and not picture yourself with a fist in the air at one of the many arenas the London-via-Suffolk singer has dominated this year alone."

Ellie Boyle from The Independent said "Dylan has found the perfect blend of pop-punk and songwriting on her debut mixtape." Boyle continued "The mixtape has themes of heartache, self-worth, and always looking at the glass half full even when there doesn't seem to be a light at the end of the tunnel."

Track listing

Charts

References

2022 mixtape albums
Island Records albums